Art from Southern United States, or Southern art, includes Southern expressionism, folk art, and modernism. Residents of the American South created works of art starting in 1607, however it was not until the early 1960s that Southern art became recognized as a distinct genre.

The Ogden Museum of Southern Art in New Orleans houses the largest single collection of Southern art. In 1992, the Morris Museum of Art opened to the public in Augusta, Georgia, with a focus on mid-twentieth century American Southern art. The Johnson Collection in South Carolina holds 1,200 pieces of Southern art that it exhibits, publishes in catalogs, and lends to other institutions.

History
The United States Census Bureau defines the South as a region including Alabama, Arkansas, Delaware, the District of Columbia, Florida, Georgia, Kentucky, Louisiana, Maryland, Mississippi, North Carolina, Oklahoma, South Carolina, Tennessee, Texas, Virginia, and West Virginia.

In 1975, Southern Arts Federation, now South Arts, was founded with funding from the National Endowment for the Arts to support and promote arts and culture in the Southeast.

Residents of the American South created works of art starting with the original settlement of Jamestown, Virginia in 1607. However, it was not until the early 1960s that art from the American South became recognized as a distinct genre. Collector Roger H. Ogden focused exclusively on the art of the region, and his donation of that collection to the Ogden Museum can be considered the first official recognition of the genre.

Southern art is more widely recognized as a distinct genre compared to the regional art of other geographic regions of the United States of America. This is a consequence of the unique role the American South played in the history of the United States. Slavery, though legal in every one of the thirteen original colonies, flourished and grew as an institution in the early 19th century in the American South, while it died out in the North. Political issues surrounding slavery caused the American Civil War, and that conflict and its resolution defined the United States and American culture today more than any single event in history. For that reason, Southern art is an important element in the story of the United States of America.

Rowan Nathaniel House offers a fine example of Southern art. He was a Mississippi native whose artwork frequently portrayed southern life, in particular, that of former slaves and their role in the south of the early 20th century.

Movements

Numerous movements are included in this broad category, including Southern expressionism, folk art, and modernism.

These movements are connected by the commonality of the Southern cultural experiences that formed the perceptions of the artists.

While antebellum Southern portraiture has much in common visually with modern Southern expressionism, it is considered Southern art because it was created by Southern artists and its subjects were residents of the American South.

References

Laufer, Marilyn, Modernism in the South: Mid-Twentieth-Century Works in the Morris Museum Collection, Morris Museum, 2002.

External links
The Ogden Museum of Southern Art
The Morris Museum:A Southern Collection
Collection: "The South (U.S. Southeast)" from the University of Michigan Museum of Art

 
Visual arts genres
American art
American folk art
Culture of the Southern United States
Arts in the United States